KIFM (1320 AM) is a radio station in West Sacramento, California, United States.

KIFM may also refer to:

 KIFM (98.1 FM), former radio station in San Diego, California, from 1978 to 2016, now KXSN
 KIFM (96.5 FM), former radio station in Bakersfield, California, United States, owned by Faith Broadcasting Network